Ampittia parva is a species of butterfly in the family Hesperiidae. It is found in north-eastern Tanzania, including Zanzibar.

References

Endemic fauna of Tanzania
Butterflies described in 1925
Ampittia